Arthur is a village in Douglas and Moultrie Counties in Illinois, with Arthur's primary street, Vine Street, being the county line. The population was 2,231 at the 2020 census. The Arthur area is home to the largest and oldest Amish community in Illinois, which was founded in the 1860s.

History 

In 1877, the population was approximately 300 persons. The community was incorporated as a village in April of that year.

The first village election was held on June 12, 1877, and C. G. McComb, Matt Hunsaker, W. H. Reeder, H. C. Jones, J. W. Sears, and Nick Thompson were elected trustees, and J. W. Barrum, clerk.

The original town was laid out on the farms of M. H. Warren on the Moultrie side, and the Pendleton Murphy farm on the Douglas County side. Early additions to the town included those by Murphy, Reeves, Hunsaker, Gibson, Warren, Reeder, followed by Kensington, Campbell, Boyd, Bennet, Fitzjarrald, and others.

An F2 tornado struck two miles south of Cadwell and moved northeast four miles south of Arthur on April 7, 1998. It lifted near Bourbon. Twenty homes, six barns, and other buildings were either damaged or destroyed. One mobile home was blown off its foundation. There were eight injuries.

In 2022, the community council revealed a flag for the village to celebrate its sesquicentennial. The new flag is flown in front of the Welcome Center and the Police department. The new flag was put up upon the start of the Strawberry Festival.

Geography

Demographics
As of the 2020 census there were 2,231 people, 951 households, and 612 families residing in the village. The racial makeup of the village was 92.38% White, 0.22% African American, 0.22% Native American, 0.49% Asian, 2.42% from other races, and 4.26% from two or more races. Hispanic or Latino of any race were 6.01% of the population.

There were 951 households, out of which 42.80% had children under the age of 18 living with them, 52.89% were married couples living together, 5.89% had a female householder with no husband present, and 35.65% were non-families. 32.07% of all households were made up of individuals, and 23.45% had someone living alone who was 65 years of age or older. The average household size was 2.83 and the average family size was 2.24.

The village's age distribution consisted of 20.5% under the age of 18, 5.5% from 18 to 24, 22.4% from 25 to 44, 21.4% from 45 to 64, and 30.1% who were 65 years of age or older. The median age was 47.3 years. For every 100 females, there were 80.8 males. For every 100 females age 18 and over, there were 83.0 males.

The median income for a household in the village was $62,250, and the median income for a family was $79,500. Males had a median income of $45,147 versus $22,105 for females. The per capita income for the village was $29,574. About 8.2% of families and 8.3% of the population were below the poverty line, including 12.3% of those under age 18 and 5.7% of those age 65 or over.

Amish community
The village of Arthur characterizes itself on its website as an Amish-friendly community, with more than 4,000 "Plain People" living in the town and surrounding rural townships. The Amish settlement near Arthur was founded in 1864 and had 30 church districts with about 150 people per district in 2013.

Arthur community was the 8th largest Amish settlement in the world with 4,410, as of 2017.

Education 
In July 2012, Arthur's longtime school district consolidated with the much smaller school district in nearby Lovington, Illinois. High school students from both towns attend school in Arthur, while grade schools are maintained in both towns. The two schools have shared a football team for many years. In August 2014, the Atwood Hammond school district consolidated with Arthur Lovington, with the school name being changed to ALAH High School.

Notable people 
 Margery C. Carlson, botanist
 George Corbett, NFL running back of 1930s, was raised in Arthur.

References

External links
 Arthur village website
 Illinois Amish Country
 More Information about Arthur, IL

Villages in Douglas County, Illinois
Villages in Moultrie County, Illinois
Villages in Illinois
Populated places established in 1877
Amish in Illinois
1877 establishments in Illinois